is a railway station on the Kyūdai Main Line operated by JR Kyūshū, in Ukiha, Fukuoka Prefecture, Japan.

Lines 
Only local trains on the line stop at the station.

Layout 
The station consists of two side platforms serving two tracks at grade. Two sidings branch off track 2. The station building is a wooden structure in Japanese style. The ticket window is managed by a Kan'i itaku agent and is equipped with a POS machine but does not have a Midori no Madoguchi facility. Access to the opposite side platform is by means of a footbridge.

Adjacent stations

History
In the second phase of expansion, the track was extended east, with  opening as the new eastern terminus on 11 July 1931. On the same day, this station was opened as an intermediate station along the new track under the name . With the privatization of Japanese National Railways (JNR), the successor of JGR, on 1 April 1987, JR Kyushu took over control of the station. On 1 May 1990, the station name was changed to Ukiha.

Passenger statistics
In fiscal 2016, the number of passengers (boarding only) using the station was between 100 and 322. The station did not rank among the top 300 busiest stations of JR Kyushu.

References

External links
Ukiha (JR Kyushu)

Railway stations in Fukuoka Prefecture
Stations of Kyushu Railway Company
Railway stations in Japan opened in 1931